Karnataka Chalanachitra Academy (English: Karnataka Film Academy) was formed by the Government of Karnataka in 2009 to promote film culture in Karnataka. 
The academy has taken up several projects to develop a healthy film culture in the state and adopted the motto of promoting 'Education in Cinema and Cinema in Education'.

Activities

Karnataka Chalanachitra Sanstha (Karnataka Movie Academy) has been conducting Film Appreciation Courses in different parts of the Karnataka state, in colleges and film societies. It has also promoted the establishment of district, institutional and campus film societies all over the state. It engaged the members of these societies to participate in the first-ever Karnataka Chalanachitra Sanstha Antarjatiya Chalanachitra Utsava (English: Karnataka Film Academy International Film Festival), a low-budget event with DVD screenings of 100 films, which found overwhelming response in Bengaluru and four other districts of Karnataka.

SV Rajendrasingh has been heading the academy as Mukhya Adhyaksha (English: Chief President) since 2014.

The academy is mandated by the government to conduct the 6th BIFFES (Bangalore International Film Festival), the international film festival in Bengaluru, from 26 December 2013, for a week, showcasing the Chalanachitra Parishrama Alli Uttama (English: Best in Cinema) from around the world.

Belli Hejje

Belli Hejje is the important program arranged by the academy every month. In this event, the academy invites one eminent personality from Cinema field to share their career, achievements with people.

Participants of Belli Hejje are:

 indicates celebrity couple

Belli Cinema Belli Maathu

Festivals
 Bangalore International Film Festival
 KCA International Film Festival – in collaboration with the Federation of Film Societies of India (FFSI)

Also Read
 Bangalore International Film Festival

References

Kannada cinema
Government of Karnataka